Dangerous Curves is the fifth studio album by American hard rock/heavy metal singer and guitarist Lita Ford, released in 1991. Though it was a popular release and received heavy video rotation on MTV, the album was not as successful as its predecessor due to its predominantly glam metal sound and the fact that musical tastes were shifting towards alternative rock in late 1991. The album charted on both the US and UK charts in 1992 and the single, "Shot of Poison", was nominated for a Grammy Award for Best Female Rock Vocal Performance in 1993. This was Lita Ford's second ever Grammy nomination and her first since 1984's "Dancin' On The Edge".

The track "Black Widow" is not to be confused for the track "Die for Me Only (Black Widow)" from Ford's 1983 debut Out for Blood.

Track listing 
Side one
 "Larger Than Life" (Michael Dan Ehmig, Lita Ford, Myron Grombacher) – 3:53
 "What Do Ya Know About Love?" (Randy Cantor, Michael Caruso, Cal Curtis) – 3:52
 "Shot of Poison" (Ford, Grombacher, Jim Vallance) – 3:31
 "Bad Love" (Ehmig, David Ezrin, Ford, Joe Taylor) – 4:20
 "Playin' with Fire" (Ehmig, Ford, Vallance) – 4:08

Side two
"Hellbound Train" (Ehmig, Ezrin, Ford, Grombacher, Kevin Savigar) – 6:06
 "Black Widow" (Ehmig, Ezrin, Ford, Taylor) – 3:30
 "Little Too Early" (Rick Blakemore, Al Pitrelli, Joe Lynn Turner) – 2:58
 "Holy Man" (Ehmig, Ford) – 4:42
 "Tambourine Dream" (Ehmig, Ford, Grombacher) – 4:53
 "Little Black Spider" (Ford) – 1:46

Personnel 
Band members
 Lita Ford - lead vocals,  guitars
 Joe Taylor - guitar
 David Ezrin - keyboards
 Matt Bissonette - bass guitar
 Myron Grombacher - drums

Additional musicians
 Howard Leese - guitar
 Jeff Scott Soto, Debbie Holiday, Joe Lynn Turner, Michael Caruso, Anne Marie Hunter - backing vocals

Production
Tom Werman - producer, mixing
Eddie DeLena - associate producer, engineer, mixing
Clif Norrell, Mike Piersante - assistant engineers
Michael Dan Ehmig - vocal arrangements
Howie Weinberg - mastering at Masterdisk, New York
Neal Avron - remastering engineer

Charts

References

1991 albums
Lita Ford albums
Albums produced by Tom Werman
RCA Records albums